The Eparchy of Bichvinta and Tskhum-Abkhazia is an eparchy (diocese) of the Georgian Orthodox Church with its seat in Sokhumi (Tskhumi), Georgia. It has jurisdiction over Districts of Sukhumi, Ochamchire, Gali, Gudauta, Gulripshi and Gagra.

Heads

References

External links
ცხუმ-აფხაზეთის ეპარქია

Religious sees of the Georgian Orthodox Church
Dioceses established in the 20th century